Gerard James Borg is a Maltese songwriter, author, and concept creator. He is well known for writing multiple songs that competed in the Eurovision Song Contest.

Borg has written six of the Maltese entries for the annual Eurovision Song Contest with composer Philip Vella. Their song "7th Wonder" sung by Ira Losco gave Malta 2nd place in the contest. This was the first time Malta reached 2nd place and it is the country's best result in the contest so far, alongside the 2nd place earned by Chiara with the song "Angel" in 2005. Borg and Vella also penned the song "Reaching Higher" as the official theme for the 2003 Games of the Small States of Europe which were held in Malta that year. Some of their compositions have also done well in foreign charts.

Borg has also co-written the song "Shine" which represented Russia in the 2014 Eurovision Song Contest and wrote songs for several national finals in other countries which include France, Norway, The Netherlands, Belgium, Greece, Iceland, Bulgaria, and Romania.

Borg has also written blog-style articles for theTimes of Malta, and some of his fashion designs appeared on the German fashion publication Burda.

Eurovision Song Contest

Eurovision Song Contest entries 

Desire by Claudette Pace  (Malta 2000)
7th Wonder by Ira Losco  (Malta 2002)
On Again... Off Again by Julie & Ludwig  (Malta 2004)
Vertigo by Olivia Lewis   (Malta 2007)
Vodka by Morena   (Malta 2008)
Shine by Tolmachevy Twins   (Russia 2014)
Breathlessly by Claudia Faniello   (Malta 2017)

National final entries

Publications 
Gerard James Borg has published 5 novels.
 Sliema Wives (2013)
 Madliena Married Men (2015)
 Bormla Babes: Behind the Scenes (2017)
 Tigné Point Bachelors (2019)
 Sliema Wives: The New Breed (2021)

Borg's debut novel Sliema Wives is a local best seller and it peaked at number one after one week of its release. Part of the proceeds from the book were donated to local charity Puttinu Cares. Similarly, Madliena Married Men also reached the number one spot in the local bestseller list.

References

External links
Official facebook site

Maltese songwriters
Melodi Grand Prix composers
English-language lyricists
Living people
Year of birth missing (living people)
English-language writers from Malta
Maltese male novelists
21st-century Maltese novelists